3-Methoxyphencyclidine (3-MeO-PCP) is a dissociative hallucinogen of the arylcyclohexylamine class related to phencyclidine (PCP) which has been sold online as a designer drug. It acts mainly as an NMDA receptor antagonist, though it has also been found to interact with the sigma σ receptor and the serotonin transporter. The drug does not possess any opioid activity nor does it act as a dopamine reuptake inhibitor.

Pharmacology
3-MeO-PCP has a K of 20 nM for the dizocilpine (MK-801) site of the NMDA receptor, 216 nM for the serotonin transporter (SERT), and 42 nM for the sigma σ receptor. It does not bind to the norepinephrine or dopamine transporter nor to the sigma σ receptor (Ki >10,000 nM). Based on its structural similarity to 3-hydroxy-PCP (3-HO-PCP), which uniquely among arylcyclohexylamines has high affinity for the μ-opioid receptor in addition to the NMDA receptor, it was initially expected that 3-MeO-PCP would have opioid activity. However, radioligand binding assays with human proteins have shown that, contrary to common belief, the drug also does not interact with the μ-, δ-, or κ-opioid receptors at concentrations of up to 10,000 nM. As such, the notion that 3-MeO-PCP has opioid activity has been described as a myth.

3-MeO-PCP binds to the NMDA receptor with higher affinity than PCP and has the highest affinity of the three isomeric anisyl-substitutions of PCP, followed by 2-MeO-PCP and 4-MeO-PCP.

Chemistry
3-MeO-PCP hydrochloride is a white crystalline solid with a melting point of 204–205 °C.

History
3-MeO-PCP was first synthesized in 1979 to investigate the structure–activity relationships of phencyclidine (PCP) derivatives. The effects of 3-MeO-PCP in humans were not described until 1999 when a chemist using the pseudonym John Q. Beagle wrote that 3-MeO-PCP was qualitatively similar to PCP with comparable potency. 3-MeO-PCP was preceded by the less potent dissociative 4-MeO-PCP and first became available as a research chemical in 2011.

Society and culture

Legal status

United Kingdom
On October 18, 2012, the Advisory Council on the Misuse of Drugs in the United Kingdom released a report about methoxetamine, saying that the "harms of methoxetamine are commensurate with Class B of the Misuse of Drugs Act (1971)". The report went on to suggest that all analogues of MXE should also become class B drugs and suggested a catch-all clause covering both existing and unresearched arylcyclohexylamines, including 3-MeO-PCP.

United States
3-MeO-PCP is not a controlled substance in the United States but possession or distribution of 3-MeO-PCP for human use could potentially be prosecuted under the Federal Analogue Act due to its structural and pharmacological similarities to PCP.

Canada
Canada's Controlled Drugs And Substances Act has for years placed all PCP analogues, derivatives, salts and further children thereof under a Schedule 1 prohibition, alongside opioids, cocaine and other top-ranked illegal psychoactives.  As such, 3-MeO-PCP is automatically banned, although it is not mentioned by name in the schedule.  Only PCP and Ketamine are specifically written in.

Sweden
Sweden's public health agency suggested classifying 3-MeO-PCP as hazardous substance on November 10, 2014.

Czech Republic
3-MeO-PCP is banned in the Czech Republic.

Chile
As per Chile's Ley de drogas, aka Ley 20000, all esters and ethers of PCP are illegal. As 3-MeO-PCP is an ether of PCP, it is thus illegal.

Portugal
3-MeO-PCP is neither a salt nor an isomer of PCP, not making it illegal.

See also
 Dexanabinol
 Ketamine
 3-MeO-PCE
 3-MeO-PCMo
 MDPCP
 Methoxyketamine

References

External links 

 3-MeO-PCP on PsychonautWiki

Arylcyclohexylamines
Designer drugs
Dissociative drugs
NMDA receptor antagonists
O-methylated phenols
1-Piperidinyl compounds
Serotonin reuptake inhibitors